Herman Sörgel (2 April 1885 – 25 December 1952) was a German architect from Bavaria. He was known for pioneering the Atlantropa project, which was initially conceived as a solution to the economic and political turmoil gripping Europe in the early 20th century. 

Atlantropa called for dams built across the Strait of Gibraltar, the Dardanelles, and between Sicily and Tunisia. The dams would provide hydroelectric power and would be overseen by a newly formed independent body with the authority to discontinue energy to any country posing a threat to peace. Sörgel actively promoted his ideas until his death in 1952.

Early life 
Herman Sörgel was born in Regensburg, Bavaria, Germany in 1885 to Bavarian parents. From 1904 to 1908 Sörgel studied architecture at The Technical University in Munich.

Written publications 
Some of his publications included:

Atlantropa

Sörgel was the originator of the idea of Atlantropa—a utopian continent created by damming the Strait of Gibraltar, the Dardanelles, and the Congo river. His idea called for the damming, and thus lowering, of the Mediterranean Sea level and then making use of the difference between the Mediterranean and the Atlantic sea levels to generate hydro-electric power. Sorgel's idea to lower sea levels would increase the dry land areas around the Mediterranean and provide overland access to Africa. Damming the Congo river would have refilled the basin surrounding Lake Chad, providing fresh water to irrigate the Sahara and shipping access to the African interior. Besides creating new bodies of land, the huge amounts of hydro-electric energy that would have been  generated could have accounted for 50% of Europe's energy needs at the time. While Sörgel was dreaming up the idea, he never took into consideration how other countries would react or change. For example, the Levant would have increased in area by 50%. Sörgel would also have had to go through several Middle Eastern countries to get to Africa, where most of the major changes would have taken place.

Death
Sörgel died at the age of 67 shortly after having been struck by a car while on his bicycle en route to a lecture at a German university in Munich. The accident happened on a road "as straight as a die" and the driver of the car was never found.

References

19th-century German architects
Technical University of Munich alumni
Authors of utopian literature
Road incident deaths in Germany
1885 births
1952 deaths
20th-century German architects